The 2019 Lagos gubernatorial election was conducted on 9 March to choose the Governor of Lagos State. The election was held concurrently with various state level elections. Incumbent APC Governor Akinwunmi Ambode lost to the APC flag bearer Babajide Sanwo-Olu at a direct primary election in October 2018 and hence ineligible to run for second term under APC. Babajide Sanwo-Olu won in a landslide against Jimi Agbaje of the PDP who had previously run unsuccessfully for Lagos state governor twice. From 1999, Lagos state has been governed by AD, AC, then ACN, three parties which subsequently formed part of the coalition that birthed  the APC in 2013.

APC primary

Candidates

Declared
 Akinwunmi Ambode, incumbent Governor of Lagos.
 Babajide Sanwo-Olu, Lagos State Minister of Establishments, Training and Pensions and former Managing director of LSPDC.

Declined
 Femi Hamzat, businessman (endorsed Sanwo-Olu and later became his running mate)

PDP primary

Candidates

Declared
 Jimi Agbaje, pharmacist and candidate for Governor in 2007 and 2015
 Deji Doherty, businessman

Declined
Femi Otedola, Oil mogul

Other governorship aspirant and party
 Chief Owolabi Salis, AD
 Princess Adebisi Ogunsanya, YPP
 Babatunde Olalere Gbadamosi, ADP
 Muyiwa Fafowora, ADC
 Barrister Ladipo Johnson, ANP
 Mrs. Omolara Adesanya, PPC
 Funsho Awe, NCP

General election

Results

See also
2019 Nigerian general election
Governor of Lagos
2019 Nigerian National Assembly election in Lagos State
2019 Nigerian gubernatorial elections

References

External links
Official campaign websites
Adebisi Ogunsanya (YPP) for Governor
Jimi Agbaje (PDP) for Governor 
Jide Sanwaolu (APC) for Governor
Femi Hamzat (APC) for Governor

Lagos
Lagos State gubernatorial elections
Lagos State gubernatorial election
2019 Lagos State elections